Baden High School is a public continuation high school in the city of South San Francisco, California.  The school is part of the South San Francisco Unified School District.

The school is named for the Baden neighborhood of South San Francisco, formerly the town of Baden before South San Francisco was incorporated.

The school serves approximately 100 students. Specialized programs include a Regional Occupation Program (ROP) program for hotel and hospitality work and a Teen Age Parenting Program.

See also
San Mateo County high schools

References

External links
Official website

South San Francisco, California
South San Francisco Unified School District
High schools in San Mateo County, California
Continuation high schools in California
Public high schools in California